Paul Hitch Roney (September 5, 1921 – September 16, 2006) was a United States circuit judge of the United States Court of Appeals for the Eleventh Circuit and the United States Court of Appeals for the Fifth Circuit.

Education and career

Born in Olney, Illinois, Roney received an Associate of Arts degree from St. Petersburg Junior College in 1940. He received a Bachelor of Science degree from University of Pennsylvania, Wharton School of Business in 1942. He received a Bachelor of Laws from Harvard Law School in 1948. He received a Master of Laws from University of Virginia School of Law in 1984. He was in the United States Army as a Staff Sergeant from 1942 to 1946. He was in private practice of law in New York City, New York from 1948 to 1950. He was in private practice of law in St. Petersburg, Florida from 1950 to 1970. He was a Lecturer for Stetson College of Law in 1957 and from 1965 to 1966.

Federal judicial service

Roney was nominated by President Richard Nixon on October 7, 1970, to a seat on the United States Court of Appeals for the Fifth Circuit vacated by Judge G. Harrold Carswell. He was confirmed by the United States Senate on October 13, 1970, and received his commission on October 16, 1970. Roney was reassigned by operation of law to the United States Court of Appeals for the Eleventh Circuit on October 1, 1981. He served as Chief Judge from 1986 to 1989. He assumed senior status on October 1, 1989. From 1994 to 2001, Roney served as Presiding Judge of the United States Foreign Intelligence Surveillance Court. His service was terminated on September 16, 2006, due to his death in St. Petersburg.

References

Sources
 
 

1921 births
2006 deaths
20th-century American judges
Harvard Law School alumni
Judges of the United States Court of Appeals for the Eleventh Circuit
Judges of the United States Court of Appeals for the Fifth Circuit
People from Olney, Illinois
Stetson University College of Law faculty
United States Army soldiers
United States court of appeals judges appointed by Richard Nixon
Wharton School of the University of Pennsylvania alumni